Jaimie Dawson (born July 28, 1969 in Geneva, Switzerland) is a badminton player from Canada, who won the gold medal in the inaugural men's singles competition at the 1995 Pan American Games. A resident of Winnipeg, Manitoba, he represented Canada at the 1996 Summer Olympics.

Dawson was a Canadian Junior Champion in Boys Singles, Boys Doubles and Mixed Doubles in the same year.

Dawson won the French Open in Men’s Singles in 1991.

In 2017, Dawson was inducted into the Manitoba Sports Hall of Fame.

References

External links
 
 
 
 
 
 

1969 births
Living people
Swiss emigrants to Canada
Sportspeople from Winnipeg
Sportspeople from Geneva
Canadian male badminton players
Badminton players at the 1996 Summer Olympics
Olympic badminton players of Canada
Badminton players at the 1995 Pan American Games
Pan American Games gold medalists for Canada
Pan American Games medalists in badminton
Commonwealth Games competitors for Canada
Badminton players at the 1994 Commonwealth Games
Medalists at the 1995 Pan American Games